Dongfang Electric Corporation is a Chinese state-owned manufacturer of power generators and the contracts of power station projects. According to Platts, in 2009-10 the company was the second largest manufacturer of steam turbines by worldwide market share, tying with Harbin Electric and slightly behind Shanghai Electric.

History
It was founded in 1984 and is based in Chengdu, Sichuan. Its subsidiary is Dongfang Electric Corporation Limited. Its H shares and A shares were listed on the Hong Kong and Shanghai.

1958: Dongfang Electric Machinery Plant was established.
1984: Dongfang Electric Corporation was established by Ding Yi.
1993: China Dongfang Electric Machinery Plant was restructured to form Dongfang Electric Machinery Company Limited.
1994: Dongfang Electric Machinery Company was listed on the Hong Kong Stock Exchange.
1995: Dongfang Electric Machinery Company was listed on the Shanghai Stock Exchange.
2007: China Dongfang Electric Corporation was listed entirely in Dongfang Electric Machinery Company. Dongfang Electric Machinery Company was renamed to Dongfang Electric Corporation Limited.

Controversy  
Dongfang was accused by General Electric in court papers of benefitting from a rigged tendering process awarded by South African utility giant Eskom to install a new boiler at the Duvha Power Station.  General Electric claims that Dongfang got the contract even though its bid was R1 billion (US$76 million) more than the General Electric bid.

See also 

 List of wind turbine manufacturers
 Wind energy companies of China
 Wind power

References

External links 
 Dongfang Electric Corporation
 Dongfang Electric Corporation Limited

Manufacturing companies of China
Wind power in China
Wind turbine manufacturers
Electrical engineering companies of China
Government-owned companies of China
Companies based in Chengdu
Companies listed on the Hong Kong Stock Exchange
Companies listed on the Shanghai Stock Exchange
H shares
Chinese companies established in 1984
Manufacturing companies established in 1984
Chinese brands